Jeong Hyoi-Soon (born April 28, 1964) is a South Korean team handball player and Olympic silver medalist. She played for the South Korean team that finished second at the 1984 Summer Olympics in Los Angeles.

References

External links

1964 births
Living people
South Korean female handball players
Olympic handball players of South Korea
Handball players at the 1984 Summer Olympics
Olympic silver medalists for South Korea
Olympic medalists in handball
Medalists at the 1984 Summer Olympics
20th-century South Korean women